Golden Years or The Golden Years may refer to:

Music
 Golden Years (album), an album by David Bowie
 The Golden Years (EP), an EP by Motörhead
 "Golden Years" (David Bowie song), 1975
 "Golden Years" (Ruel and M-Phazes song), 2017
 The Golden Year (album), an album by Ou Est le Swimming Pool
 "Golden Years", a song by Disco Ensemble

Film, television and theatre
 The Golden Years (1960 film), a 1960 film about bowling
 The Golden Years (1993 film), a 1993 Croatian film
 Golden Years (2016 film), a 2016 British film
 Golden Years (2017 film), a 2017 French film
 Golden Years (miniseries), a 1991 American miniseries from Stephen King
 “Golden Years”, a 1994 episode of Law & Order
 Golden Years (TV programme), a 1998 British TV comedy starring Ricky Gervais
 "The Golden Years" (Kim Possible), a 2003 episode of Kim Possible

Radio
 The Golden Years (play), 1940 radio play, first produced in 1987, by Arthur Miller

See also
 The Golden Year (disambiguation)
 Golden Age (disambiguation)
 Golden Era (disambiguation)
 Golden number (time), year number in the Enneadecaeteris (19 year cycles) counted from 1 BC